Mocker or Mockers may refer to:

The Mocker (comics), a comic book character
The Mockers, a New Zealand pop band
Los Mockers, a Uruguayan rock band
 Mocker Swallowtail butterfly (Papilio dardanus)
Josef Mocker (1835–1899), Czech architect
Toussaint-Eugène-Ernest Mocker (1811–1895), French opera singer and stage director